Willi Geiger  (August 17, 1878 in Landshut - February 11, 1971 in Munich) was a German painter.

Biography
The son of a teacher, Willi Geiger was born 1878 in Landshut. From 1898-99, he attended the Munich Arts and Crafts School, and later the Technical University, where he passed the state examination to teach drawing. Willi Geiger studied from 1903 with Franz von Stuck at the Munich Academy, including together with Hans Purrmann. He was awarded the National prize and the Schack scholarship for some of his early work and he traveled to Spain, Italy, and North Africa. Willi Geiger was awarded the 1910 Villa Romana prize for his success as a graphic designer. He worked with Richard Dehmel, Frank Wedekind, and others.

Geiger lived until 1914 in Berlin and presented in the gallery. Then he went back to Munich and became a professor at the School of Decorative Arts. He copied paintings by the great Spanish painters Goya, Velasquez, and El Greco and turned to portrait painting. Geiger's study of El Greco's work is reflected in his portrait of the composer Hans Pfitzner.

After the seizure of power by the Nazis, he was dismissed as a lecturer at the Leipzig Academy.  He was politically opposed to the Nazi Party, and his artworks were deemed "degenerate" by the authorities. On retirement, he continued to paint, and after the war, in 1946 taught again at the College of Fine Arts in Munich. In 1951, Willi Geiger received the Culture Prize of the City of Munich where he lived until his death in 1971.

Willi Geiger's son, Rupprecht Geiger, also became a well-known artist and professor.

See also
 List of German painters

References

20th-century German painters
20th-century German male artists
German male painters
1878 births
1971 deaths
People from Landshut
Academic staff of the Academy of Fine Arts, Munich
Academy of Fine Arts, Munich alumni
Artists from Munich
Officers Crosses of the Order of Merit of the Federal Republic of Germany